Concert: Friday the 13th – Cook County Jail is a live split album recorded at Cook County Jail in October 1972 featuring performances by jazz organist Jimmy McGriff's Quintet with guitarists George Freeman and O'Donel Levy, and saxophonist Lucky Thompson's Quartet which was released on the Groove Merchant label.

Reception 

Allmusic's Scott Yanow said: "This album contains two separate sets that were both performed before inmates at the Cook County Jail one day in 1972. Organist Jimmy McGriff and his quintet performs his lengthy two-part "Freedom Suite," generating a great deal of heat. Lucky Thompson, mostly on soprano, jams on three standards ... Thompson's hot playing (particularly on "Cherokee") makes this album worth searching for".

Track listing
All compositions by Jimmy McGriff except where noted
 "Freedom Suite (Part 1) – 8:58
 "Freedom Suite (Part 2) – 15:45
 "Green Dolphin Street" (Bronisław Kaper, Ned Washington) – 5:51	
 "Everything Happens to Me" (Matt Dennis, Tom Adair) – 5:41	
 "Cherokee" (Ray Noble) – 4:29

Personnel
Tracks 1 & 2:
Jimmy McGriff – organ
George Freeman, O'Donel Levy – guitar 
Mickey Bass – bass
Marion J. Booker – drums
Tracks 3–5:
Lucky Thompson – tenor saxophone, soprano saxophone
Cedar Walton – electric piano
Sam Jones – bass
Louis Hayes – drums

References

Groove Merchant live albums
Jimmy McGriff live albums
Lucky Thompson live albums
1973 live albums
Albums produced by Sonny Lester
Friday the 13th
Prison music